Samuel Edger (c.1823–1882) was a New Zealand non-denominational minister, writer, social reformer and community worker. He was born in East Grinstead, Sussex, England on c.1823. His daughter was Kate Edger.

Edger emigrated from London in 1862. In June 1871 he wrote: “it is one of woman’s rights...that she should enjoy an education as thorough in quality as that which is thought necessary for men." He was one of those who inspired feminist writer, Ellen Elizabeth Ellis.

References

1823 births
1882 deaths
New Zealand social workers
New Zealand writers
People from East Grinstead
New Zealand Protestant ministers and clergy
Protestant ministers and clergy in New Zealand